Zhelezna is a village in northwestern Bulgaria, part of Chiprovtsi Municipality, Montana Province.

References

Villages in Montana Province
Chiprovtsi Municipality